Pyxine lilacina is a rare species of saxicolous (rock-dwelling), foliose lichen in the family Caliciaceae. Found in East Africa, it was scientifically described as a new species in 1975 by lichenologists Dougal Swinscow and Hildur Krog. The lichen has a brownish-grey to lilac-grey thallus that is tightly appressed to its substrate. The  comprising the thallus are flat, and have pseudocyphellae (tiny pores for air exchange) as well as patches of pruina. The thallus underside is black; the internal medulla is white. The lichen contains triterpenoid compounds as well as lichexanthone; the latter substance causes the lichen to fluoresce when lit with a long-wavelength UV light.

References

Caliciales
Lichen species
Lichens described in 1975
Lichens of East Tropical Africa
Taxa named by Hildur Krog